Les Dixon (13 January 1916 – 5 November 1996) was an Australian cricketer. He played in 30 first-class matches for Queensland between 1936 and 1946.

See also
 List of Queensland first-class cricketers

References

External links
 

1916 births
1996 deaths
Australian cricketers
Queensland cricketers
Cricketers from Brisbane